Alleghenia (minor planet designation: 457 Alleghenia), provisional designation 1900 FJ, is a carbonaceous asteroid from the outer region of the asteroid belt, about 34 kilometers in diameter. It was discovered on 15 September 1900, by German astronomers Max Wolf and Friedrich Schwassmann at Heidelberg Observatory in southern Germany.

The C-type asteroid orbits the Sun at a distance of 2.6–3.6 AU once every 5 years and 5 months (1,987 days). Its orbit is tilted by 13 degrees to the plane of the ecliptic and shows an eccentricity of 0.17. Based on assumptions made by the Collaborative Asteroid Lightcurve Link, the body has a low albedo of 0.06, a typical value for a carbonaceous asteroid. In 2014, photometric light-curve observations at the Los Algarrobos Observatory (OLASU, I38), Uruguay, has given a rotation period of  hours with a brightness amplitude of 0.20 in magnitude. It was the last among the first 500 numbered asteroids to have its period measured for the first time (also see 398 Admete).

The minor planet was named by Max Wolf in honor and gratitude of U.S. optician John Brashear at Allegheny in Pennsylvania, who equipped Wolf's new telescope with state of the art optics (lenses for the 16-inch photographic doublet). Some of the finest astronomy equipment of the early 20th century were produced at Allegheny by Brashear. The body was the first discovery Wolf made with his new instrument. Wolf also expressed his gratitude by granting the naming of another of his discoveries to the American optician, who named it 484 Pittsburghia, after his home city. Brashear is also honored by a Martian and a lunar crater. The minor planet 5502 Brashear was later directly named after the famous American astronomer and instrument builder.

See also 
 Allegheny Observatory

Notes

References

External links 
 Asteroid Lightcurve Database (LCDB), query form (info )
 Dictionary of Minor Planet Names, Google books
 Asteroids and comets rotation curves, CdR – Observatoire de Genève, Raoul Behrend
 Discovery Circumstances: Numbered Minor Planets (1)-(5000)  – Minor Planet Center
 
 

000457
Discoveries by Max Wolf
Discoveries by Friedrich Karl Arnold Schwassmann
Named minor planets
19000915